The 2019–20 Tercera División is the fourth tier of Spanish football. It began in August 2019 and was supposed to end in late June 2020 with the promotion play-off finals. On 11 March 2020, the season  was suspended due to the COVID-19 pandemic in Spain.

On 6 May 2020, the Royal Spanish Football Federation announced the premature end of the leagues, revoking all relegations and planning an eventual promotion playoff to be played if possible. Each regional federation would be allowed to plan their own group for the 2020–21 season.

Competition format
The top four eligible teams in each group will play the promotion playoffs.
The champion of each group will qualify to 2020–21 Copa del Rey. If the champion is a reserve team, the first non-reserve team qualified will join the Copa.
In each group, at least three teams will be relegated to Regional Divisions.

Group 1 – Galicia

Teams

League table

Group 2 – Asturias

Teams

League table

Group 3 – Cantabria

Teams

League table

Group 4 – Basque Country

Teams

League table

Group 5 – Catalonia

Teams

League table

Group 6 – Valencian Community

Teams

League table

Group 7 – Community of Madrid

Teams

League table

Group 8 – Castile and León

Teams

League table

Group 9 – Eastern Andalusia and Melilla

Teams

League table

Group 10 – Western Andalusia and Ceuta

Teams

League table

Group 11 – Balearic Islands

Teams

League table

Group 12 – Canary Islands

Teams

League table

Group 13 – Region of Murcia

Teams

League table

Group 14 – Extremadura

Teams

League table

Group 15 – Navarre

Teams

League table

Group 16 – La Rioja

Teams

League table

Group 17 – Aragon

Teams

League table

Group 18 – Castilla–La Mancha

Teams

League table

Copa del Rey qualification
32 teams qualified for the 2020–21 Copa del Rey: the best teams in each group (excluding reserves) and the 14 best second-placed teams ranked by their points coefficient. Should any second-placed team among these 14 qualify already as the best team in its group, a ranking of third-placed teams would fill the remaining vacants.

Ranking of second-placed teams

References

External links
Royal Spanish Football Federation website

 
Tercera División seasons
4
Spain
Spain